The Ain-Diab Circuit was a Formula One road circuit built in 1957, southwest of Ain-Diab in Morocco, using the existing coast road and the main road from Casablanca to Azemmour that ran through the Sidi Abderhaman forest. Prior to 1957, the Anfa Circuit and the Agadir circuit were used for the Moroccan Grand Prix.

The  course was designed by the Royal Automobile Club of Morocco and given a full blessing from Sultan Mohammed V. It took six weeks to construct. The site hosted a non-championship F1 race in 1957. On 19 October 1958 the course was the venue for the 1958 Moroccan Grand Prix, the final round in the 1958 Formula One season. It was won by Stirling Moss driving a Vanwall, completing the 53 laps in 2h 09m 15.1s. Mike Hawthorn driving a Ferrari 246 finished second and in doing so became the first British Formula One World Champion.

During the race, the engine on the Vanwall of Stuart Lewis-Evans seized and the car spun and crashed. He was fatally burned, dying in hospital in England eight days later.

References

External links
 
 Satellite picture by Google Maps

Sport in Casablanca
Moroccan Grand Prix
Formula One circuits
Motorsport venues in Morocco
Defunct motorsport venues in Morocco
Ain-Diab